Nura (Nūra), until 1998 "Oktyabr", is a village in Almaty Region, in south-eastern Kazakhstan. It is the head of the Nura Rural District (KATO code - 196257100). Population:  
The center of the district is located 65 km north of the city of Talgar , on the banks of the Terengkara River, a branch of Talgar , near the Kapchagai dam , in a desert belt

Geography
It lies by the banks of the Terengkara river, a tributary of the Talgar, near the Kapchagay Dam.

References

Populated places in Almaty Region